Hyde Park, also known as Old Field, Hyde Farmlands, Hyde Farmlands Academy, Hyde Farms, and Hyde Park Farm, is a historic home and farm complex located at Burkeville, Nottoway County, Virginia. The original section was built between 1762 and 1782, and is a three-story, three bay, brick vernacular Federal style central passage dwelling. It was enlarged between 1840 and 1860. Between 1906 and 1911, a two-story Greek Revival-inspired brick addition was added to the east gable and a three-story Colonial Revival brick addition to the northwest corner. The farm complex also includes the tenant house, kitchen/wash house, ten log chicken houses (four in ruins), dairy barn, six small outbuildings, and the Fowlkes family cemetery. Also on the property is a large, multi-component archaeological site as well as the ruins of brooder houses, additional farm outbuildings, the tenant farmer house site, the cattle barn ruin, the old mill complex site, and the new mill complex site. During the 1930s and early 1940s, the property provided the opportunity for agriculturally skilled Jewish refugees from Nazi Germany to immigrate to America and expand the farm's productivity.

It was listed on the National Register of Historic Places in 2013.

References

Farms on the National Register of Historic Places in Virginia
Colonial Revival architecture in Virginia
Greek Revival houses in Virginia
Federal architecture in Virginia
Houses completed in 1782
Buildings and structures in Nottoway County, Virginia
National Register of Historic Places in Nottoway County, Virginia
1782 establishments in Virginia